A moraine is any accumulation of unconsolidated debris (regolith and rock), sometimes referred to as glacial till, that occurs in both currently and formerly glaciated regions, and that has been previously carried along by a glacier or ice sheet. It may consist of partly rounded particles ranging in size from boulders (in which case it is often referred to as boulder clay) down to gravel and sand, in a groundmass of finely-divided clayey material sometimes called glacial flour. Lateral moraines are those formed at the side of the ice flow, and terminal moraines were formed at the foot, marking the maximum advance of the glacier. Other types of moraine include ground moraines (till-covered areas forming sheets on flat or irregular topography) and medial moraines (moraines formed where two glaciers meet).

Etymology
The word moraine is borrowed from French  , which in turn is derived from the Savoyard Italian  ("mound of earth"). Morena in this case was derived from Provençal morre ("snout"), itself from Vulgar Latin *murrum "rounded object". The term was introduced into geology by Horace Bénédict de Saussure in 1779.

Characteristics 
Moraines are landforms composed of glacial till deposited primarily by glacial ice. Glacial till, in turn, is unstratified and unsorted debris ranging in size from silt-sized glacial flour to large boulders. The individual rock fragments are typically sub-angular to rounded in shape. Moraines may be found on the glacier's surface or deposited as piles or sheets of debris where the glacier has melted.

Formation 
Moraines may form through a number of processes, depending on the characteristics of sediment, the dynamics on the ice, and the location on the glacier in which the moraine is formed.  Moraine forming processes may be loosely divided into passive and active.

Passive processes involve the placing of chaotic supraglacial sediments onto the landscape with limited reworking, typically forming hummocky moraines.  These moraines are composed of supraglacial sediments from the ice surface.

Active processes form or rework moraine sediment directly by the movement of ice, known as glaciotectonism. These form push moraines and thrust-block moraines, which are often composed of till and reworked proglacial sediment.

Moraine may also form by the accumulation of sand and gravel deposits from glacial streams emanating from the ice margin. These fan deposits may coalesce to form a long moraine bank marking the ice margin. Several processes may combine to form and rework a single moraine, and most moraines record a continuum of processes. Reworking of moraines may lead to the formation of placer deposits of gold as is the case of southernmost Chile.

Types of moraines

Moraines can be classified either by origin, location with respect to a glacier or former glacier, or by shape.

Lateral moraines

Lateral moraines are parallel ridges of debris deposited along the sides of a glacier. The unconsolidated debris can be deposited on top of the glacier by frost shattering of the valley walls or from tributary streams flowing into the valley, or may be subglacial debris carried to the surface of the glacier, melted out, and transported to the glacier margin.

Ground moraines

Ground moraine is accumulated at the base of the ice as lodgment till with a thin and discontinuous upper layer of supraglacial till deposited as the glacier retreats. It typically is found in the areas between end moraines.

Rogen moraines

Rogen moraines or ribbed moraines are a type of basal moraines that form a series of ribs perpendicular to the ice flow in an ice sheet. The depressions between the ribs are sometimes filled with water, making the Rogen moraines look like tigerstripes on aerial photographs. Rogen moraines are named after Lake Rogen in Härjedalen, Sweden, the landform's type locality.

de Geer moraines
Closely related to Rogen moraines, de Geer moraines are till ridges up to 5m high and 10-50m wide running perpendicular to the ice flow. They occur in large groups in low-lying areas. Named for Gerard de Geer, who first described them in 1889, these moraines may have developed from crevasses underneath the ice sheet. The Kvarken has a very high density of de Geer moraines.

End or terminal moraines

End moraines, or terminal moraines, are ridges of unconsolidated debris deposited at the snout or end of the glacier.  They usually reflect the shape of the glacier's terminus.  Glaciers act much like a conveyor belt, carrying debris from the top of the glacier to the bottom where it deposits it in end moraines.  End moraine size and shape are determined by whether the glacier is advancing, receding or at equilibrium. The longer the terminus of the glacier stays in one place, the more debris accumulate in the moraine.  There are two types of end moraines: terminal and recessional.  Terminal moraines mark the maximum advance of the glacier.  Recessional moraines are small ridges left as a glacier pauses during its retreat.  After a glacier retreats, the end moraine may be destroyed by postglacial erosion.

Recessional moraine
Recessional moraines are often observed as a series of transverse ridges running across a valley behind a terminal moraine. They form perpendicular to the lateral moraines that they reside between and are composed of unconsolidated debris deposited by the glacier. They are created during temporary halts in a glacier's retreat.

Arctic push moraines
In permafrost areas an advancing glacier may push up thick layers of frozen sediments at its front. An arctic push moraine will then be formed.

Medial moraine

A medial moraine is a ridge of moraine that runs down the center of a valley floor. It forms when two glaciers meet and the debris on the edges of the adjacent valley sides join and are carried on top of the enlarged glacier. As the glacier melts or retreats, the debris is deposited and a ridge down the middle of the valley floor is created. The Kaskawulsh Glacier in the Kluane National Park, Yukon, has a ridge of medial moraine 1 km wide.

Supraglacial moraines
Supraglacial moraines are created by debris accumulated on top of glacial ice. This debris can accumulate due to ice flow toward the surface in the ablation zone, melting of surface ice or from debris that falls onto the glacier from valley sidewalls.

Washboard moraines
Washboard moraines, also known as minor or corrugated moraines, are low-amplitude geomorphic features caused by glaciers. The name "washboard moraine" refers to the fact that, from the air, it resembles a washboard.''

Veiki moraine

A Veiki moraine is a kind of hummocky moraine that forms irregular landscapes of ponds and plateaus surrounded by banks. It forms from the irregular melting of ice covered with a thick layer of debris. Veiki moraine is common in northern Sweden and parts of Canada.

See also

 Geologic features related to moraines
 
 
 
 
 
 
 Moraine examples

References

Further reading

External links

 "Glacial moraines unmistakable vestige of last ice age" – Pantagraph (Bloomington, Illinois newspaper)

Glaciology
Sediments
 
Mountaineering
Geomorphology
Glacial landforms